Antony Auclair (born May 28, 1993) is a Canadian professional American football tight end who is a free agent. He played university football at Université Laval, and was signed by the Tampa Bay Buccaneers as an undrafted free agent in 2017.

Professional career

Tampa Bay Buccaneers
Auclair signed with the Tampa Bay Buccaneers as an undrafted free agent on May 1, 2017. He made the Buccaneers' 53-man roster as the only undrafted rookie on the team. He was also drafted by the Saskatchewan Roughriders in the 4th round, with the 30th overall pick, of the 2017 CFL Draft.

On November 5, 2019, Auclair was placed on injured reserve.

Auclair re-signed with the Buccaneers on a one-year contract on March 18, 2020. He was placed on injured reserve on September 18, 2020 with a calf injury. He was activated on October 31. Auclair earned a Super Bowl championship when the Buccaneers defeated the Kansas City Chiefs by a score of 31–9 in Super Bowl LV.

Houston Texans
Auclair signed with the Houston Texans on April 14, 2021. He was released on August 31, 2021 and re-signed to the practice squad. On September 21, Auclair was signed to the active roster.

On March 30, 2022, Auclair re-signed with the Texans. He was released on August 30, 2022.

Tennessee Titans
On October 31, 2022, Auclair was signed to the Tennessee Titans practice squad. He was waived from the practice squad on November 21, 2022.

References

External links
Tampa Bay Buccaneers bio
Laval Rouge et Or bio

1993 births
Living people
Canadian players of American football
Players of Canadian football from Quebec
Canadian football tight ends
American football tight ends
Gridiron football people from Quebec
Laval Rouge et Or football players
Tampa Bay Buccaneers players
Houston Texans players
Tennessee Titans players